Robert Stewart, 1st Earl of Orkney and Lord of Zetland (Shetland) (spring of 1533 – 4 February 1593) was a recognised illegitimate son of James V, King of Scotland, and his mistress Eupheme Elphinstone. Robert Stewart was half-brother to Mary, Queen of Scots and uncle to James VI and I of Scotland and England.

Biography
In 1539 Robert Stewart was made Commendator of Holyrood Abbey, and Commendator of Charlieu Abbey in France by 1557.

In 1550, after the conclusion of the war known the Rough Wooing, he accompanied his step-mother Mary of Guise on a visit to the French court. During the Reformation Crisis, on 9 February 1560 he testified against the Hamiltons, the Duke of Châtellerault and Earl of Arran, and the Protestant Lords of the Congregation to James MacGill and John Bellenden of Auchnoule. They were collecting evidence for Henri Cleutin and Jacques de la Brosse, the French advisors of Mary of Guise who planned to have the Hamiltons charged with treason against his half-sister, Mary, Queen of Scots and France. Robert himself had signed some of the letters that were to be cited as evidence.

Mary, Queen of Scots returned to Scotland on 19 August 1561, arriving unexpectedly at Leith at 10 o'clock in the morning with her entourage of 60 companions in two galleys. Lord Robert welcomed her at Holyrood Palace. Robert, his half-brother Lord John, the Marquis of Elbeuf and others performed at the sands of Leith in a tournament in December 1561. There was "running at the ring" on the sands of Leith, with two teams of six men, Robert's team dressed as women, the other as exotic foreigners in strange masquing garments. Robert's team were the winners. There was a similar tournament in 1594 at the baptism of Prince Henry at Stirling Castle. The ambassador of Savoy, Monsieur de Moret, watched the tournament at Leith, and he was lodged in Lord Robert's house at Holyrood.

He was knighted as Sir Robert Stewart of Strathdon on 15 May 1565, as part of marriage celebrations of Mary, Queen of Scots and Henry Stuart, Lord Darnley. In 1581 he was made Earl of Orkney by James VI, the first Earl in a second creation of the Earldom of Orkney. The new earldom replaced a short-lived Dukedom of Orkney, which had been awarded in 1567 by Mary, Queen of Scots, to her notorious third husband James Hepburn, 4th Earl of Bothwell. This dukedom was forfeit later that same year after Mary was forced to abdicate and Bothwell was charged with treason. Prior to this dukedom there had existed an Earldom of Orkney that was surrendered in 1470 by William Sinclair, 3rd Earl of Orkney.

Mary wrote a will at Sheffield in 1577 ineffectually declaring his title to Orkney null and void, after Robert was imprisoned in 1575 for obtaining a letter from the King of Denmark-Norway, Frederick II declaring him sovereign of Orkney. His crimes included colluding with Shetland pirates. The Earl was imprisoned at Linlithgow Palace. He was released in 1579. He built the Palace of Birsay on Orkney. On his death in 1593 the earldom passed to his son Patrick Stewart, 2nd Earl of Orkney.

Family
On 13 or 14 December 1561 Robert Stewart married Lady Jean Kennedy, daughter of Gilbert Kennedy, 3rd Earl of Cassilis, and Margaret Kennedy. The English diplomat Thomas Randolph wrote that "Lord Robert consumethe with love for Cassillis' sister". At this time Lord Robert had a house near Holyrood Palace, but the marriage took place at the house of one of her family friends. Their children included:

 Mary, who married Patrick Gray, 6th Lord Gray (b. late 1562)
 Jean, who married Patrick Leslie, 1st Lord Lindores (b. 1563?)
 Henry, who became Master of Orkney (b. February 1565 - 1590)
 Patrick (1565/66 - 6 February 1615), who inherited the title Earl of Orkney and married Margaret Livingstone.
 John Stewart, who became Earl of Carrick and married Elizabeth Howard
 Robert, was knighted and known as Sir Robert Stewart of Middleton. Imprisoned for debt in London in 1606.
 James, was knighted and known as Sir James Stewart of Eday and Tullos, and married Margaret Lyon
 Elizabeth, who married James Sinclair of Murkle in Caithness (becoming the mother-in-law of John MacKay, Laird of Strathy in Strathnaver)
 Barbara, who married Hugh Halcro of Halcro

Robert Stewart also had a number of illegitimate children with several mistresses.

Notes

1533 births
1593 deaths
Earls of Orkney
Robert
Robert Stewart, 1st Earl of Orkney
People associated with Shetland
16th-century Scottish people
Court of James V of Scotland
Scottish princes
Orkney
Sons of kings